The Rules of Procedure of the European Parliament is the document with the operating rules of the European Parliament governing the Assembly elected under the Treaties, the Act of 20 September 1976 concerning the election of Members of the European Parliament by direct universal suffrage and the national laws resulting from the application of the Treaties.

References 

Parliamentary procedure
European Parliament
Corporate law